The Australian Capital Territory Women's Australian Football League (ACTWAFL) is the governing body of the sport in the Australian Capital Territory.

Clubs
 Eastlake Demons
 Tuggeranong Thunder
 ADFA Rams
 Belconnen MagpiesOfficial Site
 Ainslie Kangaroos
 Riverina Lions
 ANU Griffins

See also

List of Australian rules football women's leagues

References

External links
 Australian Capital Territory Women's Australian Football League

Women's Australian rules football leagues in Australia
Australian rules football competitions in the Australian Capital Territory
1998 establishments in Australia
Organizations established in 1998
Women's Australian rules football governing bodies